Joseph James Farnan Jr. (born June 15, 1945) is a former United States district judge of the United States District Court for the District of Delaware.

Education and career

Born in Philadelphia, Pennsylvania, Farnan received a Bachelor of Arts degree from King's College in 1967 and a Juris Doctor from the University of Toledo College of Law in 1970. He was a Director of the Criminal Justice Program at Wilmington College in New Castle, Delaware from 1970 to 1972. He was an assistant public defender for the State of Delaware from 1972 to 1975, and was also in private practice in Wilmington, Delaware from 1972 to 1976. He was county attorney of New Castle County, Delaware from 1976 to 1979, and was chief deputy attorney general of the state of Delaware from 1979 to 1981. He was the United States Attorney for the District of Delaware from 1981 to 1985.

Federal judicial service

On June 21, 1985, Farnan was nominated by President Ronald Reagan to a new seat on the United States District Court for the District of Delaware created by 98 Stat. 333. He was confirmed by the United States Senate on July 16, 1985, and received his commission on July 18, 1985. He served as Chief Judge from 1996 to 2000. He retired on July 31, 2010, having become the longest-serving member of the federal bench in Delaware.

Post judicial service

Since his retirement from the bench, Farnan has served as an attorney in private practice at the law firm of Farnan LLP.

References

External links
 
 Joseph Farnan's law practice

1945 births
Living people
Judges of the United States District Court for the District of Delaware
King's College (Pennsylvania) alumni
Lawyers from Philadelphia
Public defenders
United States Attorneys for the District of Delaware
United States district court judges appointed by Ronald Reagan
20th-century American judges
University of Toledo College of Law alumni
Wilmington University faculty